Below is a list of members of the European Parliament serving in the eighth term (2014–2019). It is sorted by an English perception of surname treating all variations of de/di/do, van/von, Ó/Ní, and so forth as part of the collation key, even if this is not the normal practice in a member's own country.

During the 2014–2019 term, there are 751 members of parliament divided among the 28 member states.

List of members

Austria 

On the Austrian People's Party list: (EPP Group)
Othmar Karas
Elisabeth Köstinger – until 8 November 2017Lukas Mandl – since 30 November 2017
Paul Rübig

Heinz K. Becker

On the Social Democratic Party of Austria list: (S&D)
Eugen Freund
Evelyn Regner
Jörg Leichtfried – until 23 June 2015Karoline Graswander-Hainz – from 9 July 2015
Karin Kadenbach
Josef Weidenholzer

On the Freedom Party list: (Non-inscrits, since 15 June 2015 ENF)
Harald Vilimsky
Franz Obermayr
Georg Mayer
Barbara Kappel

On The Greens – The Green Alternative list: (Greens-EFA)
Ulrike Lunacek – until 8 November 2017Thomas Waitz – since 10 November 2017
Michel Reimon
Monika Vana

On the NEOS – The New Austria list: (ALDE)
Angelika Mlinar

Belgium 

Dutch-speaking college

On the New Flemish Alliance list: (ECR Group)
Johan Van Overtveldt – until 10 October 2014Sander Loones – from 14 October 2014 until 11 November 2018Ralph Packet – from 22 November 2018
Helga Stevens
Mark Demesmaeker
Louis Ide – until 18 December 2014Anneleen Van Bossuyt – from 8 January 2015

On the Open Flemish Liberals and Democrats list: (ALDE)
Guy Verhofstadt
Annemie Neyts-Uyttebroeck – until 31 December 2014Hilde Vautmans – from 1 January 2015
Philippe De Backer – until 2 May 2016Lieve Wierinck – from 4 May 2016

On the Christian Democratic and Flemish list: (EPP Group)
Marianne Thyssen – until 31 October 2014Tom Vandenkendelaere – from 6 November 2014
Ivo Belet

On the Socialist Party – Different list: (S&D)
Kathleen Van Brempt

On the Green list: (Greens-EFA)
Bart Staes

On the Flemish Interest list: (Non-inscrits, since 15 June 2015 ENF)
Gerolf Annemans

French-speaking college

On the Socialist Party list: (S&D)
Marie Arena
Marc Tarabella
Hugues Bayet

On the Reformist Movement list: (ALDE)
Louis Michel
Frédérique Ries
Gérard Deprez

On the Ecolo list: (Greens-EFA)
Philippe Lamberts

On the Humanist Democratic Centre list: (EPP Group)
Claude Rolin

German-speaking college

On the Christian Social Party list: (EPP Group)
Pascal Arimont

Bulgaria 

On the Citizens for European Development of Bulgaria list: (EPP Group)
Andrey Kovatchev
Vladimir Urutchev
Eva Maydell
Emil Radev
Tomislav Donchev – until 6 November 2014Andrey Novakov – since 24 November 2014
Mariya Gabriel – until 6 July 2017Asim Ademov – since 14 September 2017

On the Bulgarian Socialist Party list: (S&D)
Georgi Pirinski
Iliana Iotova – until 16 January 2017Petar Kurumbashev – since 17 January 2017
Sergei Stanishev
Momchil Nekov

On the Movement for Rights and Freedoms list: (ALDE)
Filiz Hyusmenova
Iskra Mihaylova
Nedzhmi Ali
Ilhan Kyuchyuk

On the Bulgaria Without Censorship-led coalition list: (ECR Group)
Nikolay Barekov (BWC, since 4 April 2017 Reload Bulgaria)
Angel Dzhambazki (IMRO)

On the Reformist Bloc list: (EPP Group)
Svetoslav Malinov

Croatia 

On the Patrotic Coalition list:

Croatian Democratic Union (EPP Group)
Ivana Maletić
Andrej Plenković – until 13 October 2016Željana Zovko – from 24 October 2016
Dubravka Šuica
Davor Ivo Stier – until 13 October 2016Ivica Tolić – from 24 October 2016

Croatian Peasant Party (EPP Group)
 Marijana Petir (left the party in 2017)

Croatian Party of Rights dr. Ante Starčević (ECR Group)
Ruža Tomašić (left the party on 20 November 2014; since 27 January 2015 HKS)

On the Kukuriku Coalition list:

Social Democratic Party of Croatia (S&D)
Tonino Picula
Biljana Borzan

Croatian People's Party – Liberal Democrats (ALDE)
Jozo Radoš (left the party on 13 June 2017, joined later GLAS)

Istrian Democratic Assembly (ALDE)
Ivan Jakovčić

On the Croatian Sustainable Development list: (Greens-EFA)
Davor Škrlec (Left the party on 20 April 2016)

Cyprus 

On the Democratic Rally list: (EPP Group)
Eleni Theocharous (since 8 March 2016 KA and ECR Group)
Christos Stylianides – until 31 October 2014Lefteris Christoforou – from 3 November 2014

On the Progressive Party of Working People list: (GUE/NGL)
Neoklis Sylikiotis
Takis Hadjigeorgiou

On the Democratic Party list: (S&D)
Costas Mavrides

On the Movement for Social Democracy–Ecological and Environmental Movement list: (S&D)
Dimitris Papadakis (EDEK)

Czech Republic 

On the ANO 2011 list: (ALDE)
Pavel Telička (left the party on 5 February 2018)
Petr Ježek (left the party on 5 February 2018)
Dita Charanzová
Martina Dlabajová

On the TOP 09–Mayors and Independents list: (EPP Group)
Jiří Pospíšil
Luděk Niedermayer
Jaromír Štětina
Stanislav Polčák (STAN)

On the Czech Social Democratic Party list: (S&D)
Jan Keller
Olga Sehnalová
Pavel Poc
Miroslav Poche

On the Communist Party of Bohemia and Moravia list: (GUE/NGL)
Kateřina Konečná
Miloslav Ransdorf – until 22 January 2016Jaromír Kohlíček – since 4 February 2016
Jiří Maštálka

On the Christian and Democratic Union - Czechoslovak People's Party list: (EPP Group)
Michaela Šojdrová
Pavel Svoboda
Tomáš Zdechovský

On the Civic Democratic Party list: (ECR Group)
Jan Zahradil
Evžen Tošenovský

On the Party of Free Citizens list: (EFDD)
Petr Mach – until 31 August 2017Jiří Payne – since 5 September 2017

Denmark 

On the Danish People's Party list: (ECR Group)
Jørn Dohrmann
Rikke Karlsson (left the party on 16 October 2015, since 21 February 2018 Non-inscrits)
Morten Messerschmidt
Anders Primdahl Vistisen

On the Social Democrats list: (S&D)
Ole Christensen
Jeppe Kofod
Christel Schaldemose

On the Venstre list: (ALDE)
Jens Rohde (left the party on 20 December 2015 and joined the Social Liberals)
Ulla Tørnæs – until 29 February 2016Morten Løkkegaard – since 3 March 2016

On the Socialist People's Party list: (Greens-EFA)
Margrete Auken

On the Conservative People's Party list: (EPP Group)
Bendt Bendtsen

On the People's Movement against the EU list: (GUE/NGL)
Rina Ronja Kari

On the Danish Social Liberal Party list: (ALDE)
Morten Helveg Petersen

Estonia 

On the Estonian Reform Party list: (ALDE)
Andrus Ansip – until 31 October 2014Urmas Paet – since 3 November 2014
Kaja Kallas – until 5 September 2018Igor Gräzin – since 6 September 2018

On the Estonian Centre Party list: (ALDE)
Yana Toom

On the Pro Patria and Res Publica Union list: (EPP Group)
Tunne Kelam

On the Social Democratic Party list: (S&D)
Marju Lauristin – until 6 November 2017Ivari Padar – since 6 November 2017

As an Independent: (Greens-EFA)
Indrek Tarand

Finland 

On the National Coalition Party list:  (EPP)
Sirpa Pietikäinen
Henna Virkkunen
Petri Sarvamaa

On the Centre Party list: (ALDE)
Olli Rehn – until 26 April 2015Hannu Takkula – from 27 April 2015 to 28 February 2018Elsi Katainen – since 1 March 2018
Paavo Väyrynen (left the party on 10 January 2017) – until 11 June 2018Mirja Vehkaperä – since 18 June 2018
Anneli Jäätteenmäki

On the Finns Party list: (ECR Group)
Jussi Halla-aho
Sampo Terho – until 26 April 2015Pirkko Ruohonen-Lerner – since 27 April 2015

On the Social Democratic Party list: (S&D)
Liisa Jaakonsaari
Miapetra Kumpula-Natri

On the Green League list: (Greens-EFA)
Heidi Hautala

On the Left Alliance list: (GUE–NGL)
Merja Kyllönen

On the Swedish People's Party of Finland list: (ALDE)
Nils Torvalds

France 

On the National Front list (since 11 March 2018 National Rally): (Non-inscrits, since 15 June 2015 ENF)
Louis Aliot – until 20 July 2017France Jamet – since 21 July 2017
Marie-Christine Arnautu
Nicolas Bay
Dominique Bilde
Marie-Christine Boutonnet
Steeve Briois
Aymeric Chauprade (left the FN on 10 November 2015, since January 2016 Les Français Libres. 24 June–9 November 2015 ENF, since 17 April 2018 EFDD)
Mireille d'Ornano (since 4 October 2017 The Patriots and EFDD)
Édouard Ferrand – until 1 February 2018Jacques Colombier – since 2 February 2018
Sylvie Goddyn (since 20 October 2018 independent and EFDD, since 12 December 2018 Debout la France)
Bruno Gollnisch 
Jean-François Jalkh
Gilles Lebreton
Marine Le Pen – until 18 June 2017Christelle Lechevalier – since 19 June 2017
Jean-Marie Le Pen 
Philippe Loiseau
Dominique Martin
Joëlle Mélin
Bernard Monot (since 29 May 2018 Debout la France and EFDD)
Sophie Montel (from 4 October 2017 to 22 June 2018 The Patriots and EFDD, since 13 September 2018 Non-inscrit)
Florian Philippot (left FN on 21 September 2017, since 4 October 2017 The Patriots and EFDD)
Jean-Luc Schaffhauser
Mylène Troszczynski

On the Union for a Popular Movement list (since 30 May 2015 The Republicans): (EPP)
Michèle Alliot-Marie
Alain Cadec
Arnaud Danjean
Michel Dantin
Rachida Dati
Angélique Delahaye
Françoise Grossetête
Brice Hortefeux
Marc Joulaud
Philippe Juvin
Alain Lamassoure (left the party on 25 October 2017)
 (out of the party since 16 October 2014)
Constance Le Grip – until 30 November 2017Geoffroy Didier – since 1 December 2017
Nadine Morano
Élisabeth Morin-Chartier (left the party on 21 February 2018)
Renaud Muselier
Maurice Ponga
Franck Proust
Tokia Saïfi (since 14 December 2017 Agir)
Anne Sander

On the Socialist Party-Radical Party of the Left list: (S&D)
Éric Andrieu
 (since November 2017 Génération.s)
Pervenche Berès
Jean-Paul Denanot – until 10 June 2018 – since 11 June 2018
Sylvie Guillaume
Louis-Joseph Manscour

Emmanuel Maurel (from 26 October to 5 November 2018 Non-inscrit, since 6 November 2018 GUE–NGL)
Gilles Pargneaux
Vincent Peillon

Virginie Rozière (PRG until December 2017, then ))
Isabelle Thomas (since November 2017 Génération.s)

On the Union of Democrats and Independents–Democratic Movement list: (ALDE)
Jean Arthuis (UDI-AC) (since 1 September 2017 En Marche!)
Jean-Marie Cavada (UDI-NC, January–June 2015 Nous Citoyens, since September 2015 Génération Citoyens)
Marielle de Sarnez (MoDem) – until 17 May 2017Patricia Lalonde (UDI) – since 18 May 2017
Nathalie Griesbeck (MoDem)
Sylvie Goulard (MoDem, since April 2017 En Marche!) – until 17 May 2017Thierry Cornillet (Radical) – since 18 May 2017
Dominique Riquet (UDI-Radical)
Robert Rochefort (MoDem)

On the Europe Ecology – The Greens list: (Greens-EFA)
José Bové
Karima Delli
Pascal Durand (left the party on 1 February 2016)
Yannick Jadot
Eva Joly
Michèle Rivasi

On the Left Front list: (GUE–NGL)
Patrick Le Hyaric (PCF)
Jean-Luc Mélenchon (PG) – until 18 June 2017 – since 19 June 2017
Younous Omarjee (Union pour les Outremer)
Marie-Christine Vergiat

Elected as a candidate of the National Front, but left the party before inauguration: (EFDD)
Joëlle Bergeron

Germany 

On the Christian Democratic Union list: (EPP)
Burkhard Balz – until 31 August 2018Stefan Gehrold – since 20 September 2018
Reimer Böge
Elmar Brok
Daniel Caspary
Birgit Collin-Langen
Jan Christian Ehler
Karl-Heinz Florenz
Michael Gahler
Jens Gieseke
Ingeborg Gräßle
Peter Jahr
Dieter-Lebrecht Koch
Werner Kuhn
Werner Langen
Peter Liese
Norbert Lins
Thomas Mann
David McAllister
Markus Pieper
Godelieve Quisthoudt-Rowohl
Herbert Reul – until 6 July 2017Dennis Radtke – since 24 July 2017
Sven Schulze
Andreas Schwab
Renate Sommer
Sabine Verheyen
Axel Voss
Rainer Wieland
Hermann Winkler
Joachim Zeller

On the Social Democratic Party of Germany list: (S&D)
Martin Schulz – until 10 February 2017Arndt Kohn – since 24 February 2017
Birgit Sippel
Udo Bullmann
Kerstin Westphal
Bernd Lange
Evelyne Gebhardt
Jens Geier
Jutta Steinruck – until 31 December 2017Michael Detjen – since 1 January 2018
Ismail Ertug
Sylvia-Yvonne Kaufmann
Matthias Groote – until 31 October 2016Tiemo Wölken – since 14 November 2016
Ulrike Rodust
Dietmar Köster
Petra Kammerevert
Jo Leinen
Martina Werner
Peter Simon
Maria Noichl
Knut Fleckenstein
Gabi Preuß
Joachim Schuster
Susanne Melior
Constanze Krehl
Arne Lietz
Jakob von Weizsäcker – until 6 January 2019Babette Winter – since 10 January 2019
Iris Hoffmann
Norbert Neuser

On the Alliance '90 / The Greens list: (Greens-EFA)
Rebecca Harms
Sven Giegold
Ska Keller
Reinhard Bütikofer
Barbara Lochbihler
Jan Philipp Albrecht – until 2 July 2018Romeo Franz – since 3 July 2018
Helga Trüpel
Martin Häusling
Terry Reintke
Michael Cramer
Maria Heubuch

On the Left list: (GUE–NGL)
Gabi Zimmer
Thomas Händel
Cornelia Ernst
Helmut Scholz
Sabine Lösing
Fabio De Masi – until 23 October 2017Martin Schirdewan – since 8 November 2017
Martina Michels

On the Alternative for Germany list: (ECR Group)
Bernd Lucke (left the party in July 2015, joined LKR)
Hans-Olaf Henkel (left the party in July 2015, joined LKR, since 13 November 2018 independent)
Bernd Kölmel (left the party in July 2015, joined LKR, since 13 November 2018 independent)
Beatrix von Storch (left ECR group in April 2016, joined EFDD group) – until 23 October 2017Jörg Meuthen – since 8 November 2017 (EFDD)
Joachim Starbatty (left the party in July 2015, LKR, since 13 November 2018 independent)
Ulrike Trebesius (left the party in July 2015, LKR, since 13 November 2018 independent)
Marcus Pretzell (expelled from ECR group in April 2016, since May 2016 ENF and since 14 November 2017 The Blue Party).

On the Christian Social Union in Bavaria list: (EPP)
Markus Ferber
Angelika Niebler
Manfred Weber
Monika Hohlmeier
Albert Dess

On the Free Democratic Party list: (ALDE)
Alexander Graf Lambsdorff – until 23 October 2017Nadja Hirsch – since 8 November 2017
Michael Theurer – until 23 October 2017Wolf Klinz – since 8 November 2017
Gesine Meißner

On the Free Voters list: (ALDE)
Ulrike Müller

On the Pirate Party list: (Greens-EFA)
Felix Reda

On the Animal Protection Party list: (GUE–NGL)
Stefan Eck (left the party on 8 January 2015)

On the National Democratic Party of Germany list: (Non-inscrits)
Udo Voigt

On the Family Party of Germany list: (ECR Group)
Arne Gericke (from 1 June 2017 to 14 October 2018 Free Voters, since then Bündnis C)

On the Ecological Democratic Party list: (Greens-EFA)
Klaus Buchner

On The PARTY list: (Non-inscrits)
Martin Sonneborn

Greece 

On the Coalition of the Radical Left list: (GUE–NGL)
Konstantinos Chrysogonos (left the party on 6 October 2018)
Manolis Glezos – until 8 July 2015Nikolaos Chountis – since 20 July 2015 (since 1 Sept 2015 Popular Unity)
Georgios Katrougalos – until 26 January 2015Stelios Kouloglou – since 27 January 2015
Konstantina Kouneva
Dimitrios Papadimoulis
Sofia Sakorafa (left Syriza on 28 September 2015)

On the New Democracy list:  (EPP)
Manolis Kefalogiannis
Giorgos Kyrtsos
Maria Spyraki
Eliza Vozemberg
Theodoros Zagorakis

On the Golden Dawn list: (Non-inscrits)
Georgios Epitidios
Lambros Foundoulis
Eleftherios Synadinos (left the party on 25 April 2018)

On the Olive Tree list: (S&D)
Nikos Androulakis
Eva Kaili

On the River list: (S&D)
Giorgos Grammatikakis
Miltiadis Kyrkos

On the Communist Party of Greece list: (Non-inscrits)
Konstantinos Papadakis
Sotirios Zarianopoulos

On the Independent Greeks list: (ECR Group)
Notis Marias (left the party on 6 January 2015, since 5 April 2017 Greece - An Alternative Road)

Hungary 

On the Fidesz–Christian Democratic People's Party list: (EPP Group)
Ildikó Gáll-Pelcz – until 31 August 2017Lívia Járóka – since 15 September 2017
József Szájer
László Tőkés
Tamás Deutsch
András Gyürk
Kinga Gál
György Schöpflin
Norbert Erdős
Andrea Bocskor
Andor Deli
Ádám Kósa
György Hölvényi (KDNP)

On the Jobbik list: (Non-inscrits)
Krisztina Morvai (independent, severed ties with Jobbik on 13 April 2018)
Zoltán Balczó
Béla Kovács (left the party on 6 December 2017)

On the Hungarian Socialist Party list: (S&D)
Tibor Szanyi
István Ujhelyi

On the Democratic Coalition list: (S&D)
Csaba Molnár
Péter Niedermüller

On the Together 2014–Dialogue for Hungary list: (Greens-EFA)
Benedek Jávor

On the Politics Can Be Different list: (Greens-EFA)
Tamás Meszerics (independent, left the party on 22 October 2018)

Ireland 

As candidates of Fine Gael: (EPP Group)
Deirdre Clune
Brian Hayes
Seán Kelly
Mairead McGuinness

As candidates of Sinn Féin: (GUE–NGL)
Lynn Boylan
Matt Carthy
Liadh Ní Riada

As a candidate of Fianna Fáil, but expelled a month after the election: (ECR Group)
Brian Crowley

As Independent candidates:
Nessa Childers (S&D)
Luke 'Ming' Flanagan (GUE–NGL)
Marian Harkin (ALDE)

Italy 

On the Democratic Party list: (S&D)
Brando Benifei
Goffredo Bettini
Simona Bonafé
Mercedes Bresso
Renata Briano
Nicola Caputo
Caterina Chinnici
Sergio Cofferati (until 19 January 2015, since November 2015 SI)
Silvia Costa
Andrea Cozzolino
Nicola Danti
Paolo De Castro
Isabella De Monte
Enrico Gasbarra
Elena Gentile
Michela Giuffrida
Roberto Gualtieri
Cécile Kyenge
Alessandra Moretti – until 1 February 2015Damiano Zoffoli – since 18 February 2015
Luigi Morgano
Alessia Mosca
Pier Antonio Panzeri (since 25 February 2017 Art.1)
Massimo Paolucci (since 25 February 2017 Art.1)
Pina Picierno
Gianni Pittella – until 22 March 2018Giuseppe Ferrandino – since 17 April 2018
David Sassoli
Elly Schlein (left the party on 9 July 2015, since then Possible)
Renato Soru (from 10 May 2016 to 15 May 2017 Non-inscrits)
Patrizia Toia
Daniele Viotti
Flavio Zanonato (since 25 February 2017 Art.1)

On the Five Star Movement list: (EFDD)
Isabella Adinolfi
Marco Affronte (since 11 January 2017 Greens-EFA)
Laura Agea
Daniela Aiuto
Tiziana Beghin
David Borrelli (since 13 February 2018 Non-inscrits)
Fabio Massimo Castaldo
Ignazio Corrao
Rosa D'Amato
Eleonora Evi
Laura Ferrara
Giulia Moi
Piernicola Pedicini
Dario Tamburrano
Marco Valli
Marco Zanni (since 11 January 2017 ENF and 15 May 2018 Lega Nord)
Marco Zullo

On the Forza Italia list: (EPP Group)
Salvatore Cicu
Alberto Cirio
Lara Comi
Raffaele Fitto (since 28 January 2017 DI and ECR Group)
Elisabetta Gardini
Fulvio Martusciello
Barbara Matera
Alessandra Mussolini (from 30 November to 11 December 2016 Non-inscrits, left the party on 3 September 2018 but remained in the group)
Aldo Patriciello
Salvo Pogliese – until 14 July 2018Giovanni Miccichè – from 19 July 2018 to 19 August 2018Innocenzo Leontini – since 20 August 2018
Remo Sernagiotto (since 28 January 2017 DI and ECR Group)
Antonio Tajani
Giovanni Toti – until 9 July 2015Stefano Maullu – since 13 July 2015

On the Lega Nord list: (Non-inscrits, since 15 June 2015 ENF)
Mara Bizzotto
Mario Borghezio
Gianluca Buonanno – until 5 June 2016Angelo Ciocca – since 7 July 2016
Flavio Tosi – until 8 July 2014Lorenzo Fontana – from 11 July 2014 to 22 March 2018Giancarlo Scottà – from 17 April 2018
Matteo Salvini – until 22 March 2018Danilo Oscar Lancini – since 17 April 2018

On the New Centre-Right–Union of Christian and Centre Democrats list: (EPP Group)
Lorenzo Cesa
Giovanni La Via (from 18 March 2017 to 13 November 2018 AP, since then FI)
Massimiliano Salini (since 1 October 2015 FI)

On The Other Europe list: (GUE–NGL)
Eleonora Forenza
Curzio Maltese
Barbara Spinelli (left the party on 18 May 2015)

On the South Tyrolean People's Party list: (EPP Group)
Herbert Dorfmann

Latvia 

On the Unity list: (EPP Group)
Valdis Dombrovskis – until 31 October 2014Inese Vaidere – from 1 November 2014
Sandra Kalniete
Artis Pabriks (joined Movement For! on 3 June 2018) – until 5 November 2018Kārlis Šadurskis – since 28 November 2018
Arturs Krišjānis Kariņš – until 23 January 2019Aleksejs Loskutovs – since 24 January 2019

On the National Alliance list: (ECR Group)
Roberts Zīle

On the Harmony list: (S&D)
Andrejs Mamikins (left the party in June 2018, joined Latvian Russian Union)

On the Union of Greens and Farmers list: (EFDD, 16 Oct 2014–27 Apr 2015 Non-inscrits, since 27 April 2015 ALDE)
Iveta Grigule (LZS)

On the For Human Rights in United Latvia list: (Greens-EFA)
Tatjana Ždanoka – until 4 March 2018Miroslavs Mitrofanovs – since 5 March 2018

Lithuania 

On the Homeland Union list: (EPP Group)
Algirdas Saudargas
Gabrielius Landsbergis – until 12 May 2016Laima Andrikienė – since 30 May 2016

On the Social Democratic Party of Lithuania list: (S&D)
Zigmantas Balčytis
Vilija Blinkevičiūtė

On the Liberal Movement list: (ALDE)
Antanas Guoga (left the party and since 5 October 2016 EPP Group)
Petras Auštrevičius

On the Order and Justice list: (EFDD)
Rolandas Paksas
Valentinas Mazuronis (since 19 May 2015 Labour Party and ALDE, left the Labour Party on 7 November 2017)

On the Labour Party list: (ALDE)
Viktor Uspaskich

On the Electoral Action of Poles in Lithuania list: (ECR Group)
Valdemar Tomasevski

On the Lithuanian Peasant and Greens Union list: (Greens-EFA)
Bronis Ropė

Luxembourg 

On the Christian Social People’s Party list: (EPP Group)
Viviane Reding – until 1 September 2018Christophe Hansen – since 2 September 2018
Georges Bach
Frank Engel

On the Greens list: (Greens-EFA)
Claude Turmes – until 19 June 2018Tilly Metz – since 20 June 2018

On the Democratic Party list: (ALDE)
Charles Goerens

On the Luxembourg Socialist Workers' Party list: (S&D)
Mady Delvaux-Stehres

Malta 

As candidates of the Nationalist Party: (EPP Group)
Roberta Metsola
David Casa
Therese Comodini Cachia – until 23 June 2017Francis Zammit Dimech – since 24 June 2017

As candidates of the Labour Party: (S&D)
Alfred Sant
Miriam Dalli
Marlene Mizzi

Netherlands 

On the Christian Democratic Appeal list: (EPP Group)
Annie Schreijer-Pierik
Lambert van Nistelrooij
Esther de Lange
Jeroen Lenaers
Wim van de Camp

On the Democrats 66 list: (ALDE)
Sophie in 't Veld
Gerben-Jan Gerbrandy
Marietje Schaake
Matthijs van Miltenburg

On the Party for Freedom list: (Non-inscrits, since 15 June 2015 ENF)
Olaf Stuger
Marcel de Graaff
Vicky Maeijer – until 15 March 2017André Elissen – since 13 June 2017
Hans Jansen – until 5 May 2015Auke Zijlstra – since 1 September 2015 (as Non-Inscrits from 1 to 7 September 2015)

On the People's Party for Freedom and Democracy list: (ALDE)
Jan Huitema
Hans van Baalen
Cora van Nieuwenhuizen – until 25 October 2017Caroline Nagtegaal – since 14 November 2017

On the Labour Party list: (S&D)
Paul Tang
Agnes Jongerius
Kati Piri

On the Socialist Party list: (GUE/NGL Group)
Anne-Marie Mineur
Dennis de Jong

On the Christian Union–Reformed Political Party list: (ECR Group)
Peter van Dalen (CU)
Bas Belder (SGP)

On the GreenLeft list: (Greens-EFA)
Bas Eickhout
Judith Sargentini

On the Party for the Animals list: (GUE/NGL Group)
Anja Hazekamp

Poland 

On the Civic Platform list: (EPP Group)
Michał Boni
Jerzy Buzek
Danuta Hübner
Danuta Jazłowiecka
Agnieszka Kozłowska-Rajewicz
Barbara Kudrycka
Janusz Lewandowski
Elżbieta Łukacijewska
Jan Olbrycht
Julia Pitera
Marek Plura
Dariusz Rosati
Jacek Saryusz-Wolski (since 23 March 2017 non-inscrits)
Adam Szejnfeld
Róża Thun
Jarosław Wałęsa
Bogdan Wenta – until 5 November 2018Bogusław Sonik – since 20 November 2018
Bogdan Zdrojewski
Tadeusz Zwiefka

On the Law and Justice list: (ECR Group)
Ryszard Czarnecki
Andrzej Duda – until 25 May 2015Edward Czesak – since 11 June 2015
Anna Fotyga
Beata Gosiewska
Marek Gróbarczyk – until 15 November 2015Czesław Hoc – since 27 November 2015
Dawid Jackiewicz – until 15 November 2015Sławomir Kłosowski – since 27 November 2015
Marek Jurek (Right Wing of the Republic)
Karol Karski
Zdzisław Krasnodębski (independent)
Zbigniew Kuźmiuk
Ryszard Legutko
Stanisław Ożóg
Bolesław Piecha
Mirosław Piotrowski (left the party on 9 October 2014)
Tomasz Poręba
Kazimierz Michał Ujazdowski (left the party on 3 January 2017, since 13 April 2018 Non-inscrit)
Jadwiga Wiśniewska
Janusz Wojciechowski – until 7 May 2016Urszula Krupa (independent) – since 24 June 2016
Kosma Złotowski

On the Democratic Left Alliance-Labor Union list: (S&D)
Adam Gierek (UP)
Bogusław Liberadzki (SLD)
Krystyna Łybacka (SLD)
Janusz Zemke (SLD)

On the Congress of the New Right list: (Non-inscrits, since 15 June 2015 ENF)
Robert Iwaszkiewicz (since 20 October 2014 EFDD, since January 2015 member of the party KORWiN)
Janusz Korwin-Mikke (left the party and founded KORWiN on 22 January 2015) – until 1 March 2018 – since 22 March 2018
Michał Marusik
Stanisław Żółtek

On the Polish People's Party list: (EPP Group)
Andrzej Grzyb
Krzysztof Hetman
Jarosław Kalinowski
Czesław Siekierski

Elected on the Democratic Left Alliance list, but left the party before inauguration: (S&D)
Lidia Geringer de Oedenberg

Portugal 

On the Socialist Party list: (S&D)
Francisco Assis
Maria João Rodrigues
Carlos Zorrinho
Elisa Ferreira – until 19 June 2016Manuel António dos Santos – since 28 June 2016
Ricardo Serrão Santos
Ana Maria Gomes
Pedro Silva Pereira
Liliana Rodrigues

On the Portugal Alliance coalition list: (EPP Group)
Paulo Rangel (PSD)
 (PSD)
Sofia Ribeiro (PSD)
Nuno Melo (CDS-PP)
Carlos Coelho (PSD)
Cláudia Aguiar (PSD)
José Manuel Fernandes (PSD)

On the Democratic Unitarian Coalition list: (GUE/NGL)
João Ferreira
Inês Zuber – until 30 January 2016João Pimenta Lopes – since 31 January 2016

On the Earth Party list: (ALDE)
António Marinho e Pinto (left the MPT in September 2014, formed the PDR in February 2015)
 (since 12 December 2016 EPP Group)

On the Left Bloc list: (GUE/NGL)
Marisa Matias

Romania 

On the Social Democratic Party-led coalition list: (S&D)
 Corina Crețu – until 31 October 2014 – from 1 November 2014
 Cătălin Ivan (since 27 September 2018 independent and Non-inscrits)
 Dan Nica
 Maria Grapini (until 7 July 2015 PC, after that PPUSL)
 Damian Drăghici (UNPR, left the party on 28 November 2016)
 Daciana Sârbu (left the party on 9 July 2018 but remained in the group)
 Ioan Mircea Pașcu
 Viorica Dăncilă – until 28 January 2018Gabriela Zoană – since 30 January 2018
 Sorin Moisă (until 21 November 2017, then Non-inscrits, and EPP Group since 29 November 2017)
 Victor Boștinaru
 
  (UNPR, since 30 June 2016 PSD)
 Laurențiu Rebega (until 14 July 2015 PC, then independent, from 25 August 2015 to 2 March 2018 ENF, since 3 April 2018 ECR)
 Ana-Claudia Țapardel
 
 Victor Negrescu – until 29 June 2017Răzvan Popa – since 13 September 2017

On the National Liberal Party list: (EPP Group)
 Norica Nicolai (ALDE, left the PNL on 12 October 2015, since 1 February 2017 ALDE Romania)
 Adina-Ioana Vălean
 Ramona Mănescu
 Cristian Bușoi
 Renate Weber (since 17 November 2014 ALDE, left the PNL on 10 September 2015)
 Eduard Hellvig – until 1 March 2015 – since 2 March 2015

On the Democratic Liberal Party list (merged into the National Liberal Party on 17 November 2014): (EPP Group)
 Theodor Stolojan
 Monica Macovei (left the PLD in September 2014, founded M10 in June 2015, since 27 October 2015 ECR Group)
 Traian Ungureanu
 Marian-Jean Marinescu
 Daniel Buda

On the Democratic Union of Hungarians in Romania list: (EPP Group)
 Iuliu Winkler
 Csaba Sógor

On the People's Movement Party list: (EPP Group)
 Cristian Preda (left the PMP in December 2014)
 Siegfried Mureșan (left the party and joined PNL on 7 May 2018)

As an Independent: (ALDE)
 Mircea Diaconu

Slovakia 

On the Direction – Social Democracy list: (S&D)
Monika Flašíková-Beňová
Boris Zala
Vladimír Maňka
Monika Smolková

On the Christian Democratic Movement list: (EPP Group)
Anna Záborská
Miroslav Mikolášik

On the Slovak Democratic and Christian Union list: (EPP Group)
Eduard Kukan (left the party on 29 September 2016)
Ivan Štefanec (left the party on 25 February 2015 and joined KDH on 7 July 2015)

On the Ordinary People and Independent Personalities list: (ECR Group)
Branislav Škripek

On the New Majority list: (ECR Group)
Jana Žitňanská

On the Freedom and Solidarity list: (ALDE; since 8 October 2014 ECR Group)
Richard Sulík

On the Party of the Hungarian Community list: (EPP Group)
Pál Csáky

On the Most–Híd list: (EPP Group)
József Nagy

Slovenia 

On the Slovenian Democratic Party list: (EPP Group)
Milan Zver
Romana Tomc
Patricija Šulin

On the New Slovenia-Slovenian People’s Party list: (EPP Group)
Lojze Peterle
Franc Bogovič

On the Verjamem list: (Greens-EFA)
Igor Šoltes

On the Social Democrats list: (S&D)
Tanja Fajon

On the Democratic Party of Pensioners of Slovenia list: (ALDE)
Ivo Vajgl

Spain 

On the People's Party list: (EPP Group)
Miguel Arias Cañete – until 31 October 2014Carlos Iturgaiz – from 3 November 2014
Esteban González Pons
Teresa Jiménez-Becerril
Luis de Grandes Pascual
Pilar del Castillo
Ramón Luis Valcárcel
Rosa Estaràs
Francisco José Millán Mon
Pablo Zalba Bidegain – until 17 November 2016José Ignacio Salafranca Sánchez-Neyra – since 3 January 2017
Verónica Lope Fontagne
Antonio López-Istúriz White
Santiago Fisas
Gabriel Mato Adrover
Pilar Ayuso González
Esther Herranz García
Agustín Díaz de Mera García Consuegra

On the Spanish Socialist Workers' Party list: (S&D)
Elena Valenciano
Ramón Jáuregui
Soledad Cabezón Ruiz
Juan Fernando López Aguilar (15 April – 21 July 2015 Non-inscrits)
Iratxe García
Javier López Fernández
Inmaculada Rodríguez-Piñero
Enrique Guerrero Salom
Eider Gardiazabal Rubial
José Blanco López
Clara Aguilera García
Sergio Gutiérrez Prieto
Inés Ayala
Jonás Fernández Álvarez

On the United Left–Initiative for Catalonia Greens list:  (GUE/NGL)
Willy Meyer Pleite – until 9 July 2014Javier Couso Permuy – since 15 July 2014
Paloma López Bermejo
Ernest Urtasun (ICV) (Greens-EFA)
Marina Albiol
Lidia Senra (Anova)
Ángela Rosa Vallina

On the Podemos list: (GUE/NGL)
Pablo Iglesias Turrión - until 27 October 2015Xabier Benito Ziluaga – since 25 November 2015
Teresa Rodríguez – until 4 March 2015Miguel Urbán Crespo – since 5 March 2015
Carlos Jiménez Villarejo – until 31 July 2014Tania González Peñas – since 11 September 2014
Lola Sánchez Caldentey
Pablo Echenique Robba – until 14 March 2015Estefanía Torres Martínez – since 25 March 2015

On the Union, Progress and Democracy list: (ALDE)
Francisco Sosa Wagner – until 19 October 2014Enrique Calvet Chambon – from 20 November 2014 (left the party on 23 June 2015)
Maite Pagazaurtundúa
Fernando Maura Barandiarán – until 24 November 2015Teresa Giménez Barbat – since 25 November 2015 (left UPyD on 7 April 2016)
Beatriz Becerra (left UPyD on 1 April 2016)

On the Coalition for Europe list: (ALDE)
Ramon Tremosa (CDC)
Izaskun Bilbao Barandica (PNV)
Francesc de Paula Gambús (UDC, left the party on 11 May 2016) (EPP Group)

On The Left for the Right to Decide list: (Greens-EFA)
Josep Maria Terricabras (ERC)
Ernest Maragall (NECat) – until 30 December 2016Jordi Solé i Ferrando (ERC) – since 3 January 2017

On the Citizens – Party of the Citizenry list: (ALDE)
Javier Nart
Juan Carlos Girauta – until 11 January 2016.Carolina Punset – from 3 February 2016 (left the party on 20 October 2018 but remained in the group)

On The Peoples Decide list: (GUE/NGL)
Josu Juaristi (EH Bildu) – until 27 February 2018<ref>Resigned his seat on 27 February 2018</ref>Ana Miranda Paz (BNG, Greens-EFA) – since 28 February 2018

On the European Spring list: (Greens-EFA)Jordi Sebastià (Compromis) – until 9 October 2016.Florent Marcellesi (Equo) – from 11 October 2016

 Sweden 

On the Social Democratic list: (S&D)
Marita Ulvskog
Olle Ludvigsson
Jytte GutelandJens Nilsson – until 13 March 2018Aleksander Gabelić – since 4 April 2018
Anna Hedh

On the Green Party list: (Greens-EFA)Isabella Lövin – until 2 October 2014Linnéa Engström – from 8 October 2014Peter Eriksson – until 24 May 2016Jakop Dalunde – since 7 June 2016
Bodil Valero
Max Andersson

On the Moderate Party list: (EPP Group)
Anna Maria Corazza Bildt
Gunnar Hökmark
Christofer Fjellner

On the Liberal People's Party list: (ALDE)Marit Paulsen – until 29 September 2015Jasenko Selimovic – from 30 September 2015
Cecilia Wikström

On the Sweden Democrats list: (EFDD)
Kristina Winberg
Peter Lundgren

On the Centre Party list: (ALDE)
Fredrick Federley

On the Left Party list: (GUE/NGL Group)
Malin Björk

On the Christian Democrats list: (EPP Group)Lars Adaktusson – until 23 September 2018Anders Sellström – since 3 October 2018

On the Feminist Initiative list: (S&D)
Soraya Post

 United Kingdom 

On the UKIP list: (EFDD)
Stuart Agnew (since 16 January 2019 ENF)
Tim Aker (left the party on 5 December 2018, since 12 February 2019 The Brexit Party)
Jonathan Arnott (left the party on 19 January 2018, since April 2019 The Brexit Party)
Janice Atkinson (expelled from UKIP, joined ENF on 15 June 2015)
Amjad Bashir (joined the Conservatives and the ECR Group on 23 January 2015)
Gerard Batten (Non-Inscrits 8 December 2018 – 16 January 2019, since then ENF)
Louise Bours (left the party on 22 November 2018)
James Carver (left the party on 28 May 2018, Non-Inscrits)
David Coburn (left the party on 7 December 2018, since 12 February 2019 The Brexit Party)
Jane Collins (since 16 January 2019 ENF, joined The Brexit Party in April 2019)
William Dartmouth (left the party on 19 October 2018)
Bill Etheridge (left the party on 1 October 2018, 8 October 2018-12 February 2019Libertarian Party, since then The Brexit Party)
Nigel Farage (left the party on 4 December 2018, since 12 February 2019 The Brexit Party)
Ray Finch (since April 2019 The Brexit Party)
Nathan Gill (left the party on 6 December 2018, since 12 February 2019 The Brexit Party)Roger Helmer – until 31 July 2017Jonathan Bullock – since 1 August 2017 (left the party on 9 December 2018, since 12 February 2019 The Brexit Party)
Mike Hookem
Diane James (Non-Inscrits since 20 November 2016, joined The Brexit Party in April 2019)
Paul Nuttall (left the party on 7 December 2018, since 12 February 2019 The Brexit Party)
Patrick O'Flynn (left the party on 27 December 2018, since then Social Democratic Party)
Margot Parker (since April 2019 The Brexit Party)
Julia Reid (left the party on 8 December 2018, since 12 February 2019 The Brexit Party)
Jill Seymour (since April 2019 The Brexit Party)
Steven Woolfe (Non-Inscrits since 24 October 2016)

On the Labour Party list: (S&D)
Lucy Anderson
Paul Brannen
Richard Corbett
Seb DanceAnneliese Dodds – until 8 June 2017John Howarth – since 30 June 2017
Neena Gill
Theresa Griffin
Mary HoneyballRichard Howitt – until 1 November 2016Alex Mayer – since 15 November 2016Afzal Khan – until 8 June 2017Wajid Khan – since 29 June 2017
Judith Kirton-Darling
David Martin
Linda McAvan
Clare Moody
Claude Moraes
Siôn SimonCatherine Stihler – until 31 January 2019Derek Vaughan
Julie WardGlenis Willmott – until 2 October 2017Rory Palmer – since 3 October 2017

On the Conservative Party list: (ECR Group)
Richard Ashworth (since 28 February 2018 EPP Group)Philip Bradbourn – until 19 December 2014Daniel Dalton – from 8 January 2015
David Campbell Bannerman
Nirj DevaIan Duncan – until 22 June 2017Nosheena Mobarik – since 8 September 2017Vicky Ford – until 8 June 2017John Flack – since 28 June 2017
Jacqueline Foster
Ashley Fox
Julie Girling (since 28 February 2018 EPP Group)
Daniel Hannan
Syed Kamall
Sajjad KarimTimothy Kirkhope - until 5 October 2016John Procter – since 17 November 2016Andrew Lewer – until 8 June 2017''Rupert Matthews – since 29 June 2017
Emma McClarkin
Anthea McIntyre
Kay Swinburne
Charles Tannock
Geoffrey Van Orden

On the Green Party of England and Wales list: (Greens-EFA)
Jean Lambert
Molly Scott Cato
Keith Taylor

On the Scottish National Party list: (Greens-EFA)
Ian Hudghton
Alyn Smith

On the Liberal Democrats list: (ALDE)
Catherine Bearder

On the Plaid Cymru list: (Greens-EFA)
Jill Evans

Northern Ireland

As a candidate of Sinn Féin: (GUE/NGL Group)
Martina Anderson

As a candidate of the Democratic Unionist Party: (Non-inscrits)
Diane Dodds

As a candidate of the Ulster Unionist Party: (ECR Group)
Jim Nicholson

Members of the European Parliament who are also citizen of a non-EU country
Andrea Bocskor who was elected in Hungary for Fidesz holds besides her Hungarian citizenship also Ukrainian citizenship (this practice is quite common among the Hungarian minority in Ukraine, although, at the time of her election, Ukrainian law did not recognize dual citizenship). Hence, she became the first elected Ukrainian in the European Parliament. Bocskor lives in Ukraine; in the city Berehove.

Notes

See also
2014 European Parliament election
Members of the European Parliament 2014–2019